National One Day Cup may refer to any one of the following domestic limited overs cricket competitions:

Australian domestic limited-overs cricket tournament
ECB National Club Cricket Championship, England and Wales
National One Day Championship, Pakistan
Royal London One-Day Cup, England and Wales